Trinity Christian School is a private Christian school founded in 1981. The campus is located at Trinity Church in Cedar Hill, Texas and is affiliated with Trinity Ministries. 

Trinity School educates students from pre-school and K5 – 12th grade students, and is considered a College Preparatory School.

Locally the school is referred to as Trinity Christian School-Cedar Hill (or TCS) to distinguish it from Trinity Christian-Addison.

History
Founded in 1981, Trinity Christian School is one of the oldest and largest Christian schools in southern Dallas County. TCS was founded by the Trinity Church Board of Trustees. The school is a non-profit organization governed by a board of trustees from Trinity Church of the Assemblies of God. It was closed in 2021 after 40 years of serving the south Dallas community.

Student life 
AP and Honors classes include English, Science, Math, and History. Clubs and groups for students include an elected Student Council, Yearbook, Worship Band, Jazz Band, Handbells, a student-run newspaper, chapel, prayer groups, National Honor Society, chess club, and machine club.

Sports
Varsity athletics events in which the school participates include US Basketball, US Coed Soccer, US Football, US Baseball, Track and Field, Tennis, Golf, Cheerleading, Volleyball, and Softball.

Trinity has teams of soccer, basketball, baseball, football, track and field, volleyball, golf, tennis, cheerleading, softball, wrestling, and competitive weightlifting. Trinity competes in the TAPPS (TAPPS) and has won numerous honors, including:

Varsity boys football: State Champion (1991, 1993, 1994, 2014, 2017, 2018, 2019, 2020), State finalist (2005, 2006, 2008, 2015) Known as the Back to Back State Champs
Varsity boys basketball: State Champion (2008, 2015, 2016), State Finalist (2007) 2018 State Runner Up
Varsity girls basketball: State Champion (2019)
Varsity boys track & field: State Champion (2006, 2016, 2017, 2018), State runner-up (2007)
Varsity girls track & field: State runner-up (2017)
Varsity boys golf: Two State Finalists in 2006 (Chandler Gadis)(Nick Storbachen)

Memberships 
Formerly member of TAPPS - Texas Association of Private & Parochial Schools. December 2019, membership terminated from TAPPS after handful of alleged violations, including use of controlled substance after football state championship.

Academics 
Trinity's academic program gives detailed courses on the Bible (Old Testament and New Testament).

Traditions 
Traditions include an annual homecoming game in which each class's float has a parade and other fun activities, "Senior Night", school-wide retreats, a senior missions trip to a foreign country, a "spiritual emphasis" week where there is a week of encounter with God, and after spiritual emphasis there are plunge parties where the students who had an encounter with God are baptized.

References

External links 
Trinity Christian School Homepage
Trinity Football Homepage
TAPPS Homepage
Trinity Ministries

1981 establishments in Texas
Christian schools in Texas
Educational institutions established in 1981
Private K-12 schools in Dallas County, Texas